Horseshoe Lake State Fish and Wildlife Area is an Illinois state park on  in Alexander County, Illinois, United States. Also see: Horseshoe Lake (Alexander County, Illinois)

References

State parks of Illinois
Protected areas of Alexander County, Illinois